Keratsa Petritsa was a Bulgarian noblewoman (bolyarka), sister of tsar Michael Shishman of Bulgaria. Her eldest son Ivan Alexander rose to the Bulgarian throne after vicissitudes of politics.

Keratsa descended, via a lateral line, from Ivan Asen II. She was the sister of Michael III Shishman Asen and Belaur, children of despotēs Shishman of Vidin by an unnamed daughter of sebastokrator Peter and Anna (Theodora). She was also a distant cousin of tsar Theodore Svetoslav and tsar George II Terter. She was Catholic.

Since the middle of the 13th century, the area of Vidin had been effectively autonomous under ineffective Bulgarian overlordship, and was ruled successively by Yakov Svetoslav (died 1276), Shishman (died between 1308 and 1313), and then the future Michael Asen III. Shishman and his son received the high courtly title of despotēs from their cousin Theodore Svetoslav and, on the childless death of young George Terter II in 1323, the brother of Keratsa Petritsa was elected emperor of Bulgaria by the nobility.

Keratsa Petritsa converted from Catholicism to Orthodoxy at some point, and retired to a convent under the monastic name Theophana (Теофана). Her memory is honored in the Bulgarian Orthodox Synodic (Синодик):

Issue 
Keratsa Petritsa married despot Sratsimir of Kran. They had five children:
Ivan Alexander (or Ivan Shishman), despot of Lovech, who succeeded as emperor of Bulgaria after a coup in 1331.
Helena, married Serbian King Stefan Dušan in 1332.
John Komnenos Asen, who was made despotes of Valona by his brother-in-law Stefan Dushan of Serbia.
Michael, despotes of Vidin
Theodora


Annotations
She is known in sources as Despotess Keratsa (деспотица Кераца). She is also called Kera Petritsa (Кера Петрица). In correspondence with Pope Benedict XII she is called Petrissa, rendered in Bulgarian as Petritsa (Петрица). The name "Keratsa" is not known in Bulgarian history. "Keratsa" or "Kiratsa" are diminutives of the Greek title kyr (lord).

References

Sources

Medieval Bulgarian nobility
14th-century Bulgarian nuns